Danika Yarosh (born October 1, 1998) is an American actress. She appeared in the Showtime series Shameless and in the NBC series Heroes Reborn. She co‐starred with Tom Cruise in Jack Reacher: Never Go Back (2016).

Early life
Yarosh is a native of Bedminster, New Jersey, the daughter of Victor and Linda Yarosh. She has three siblings, an older sister, Amanda, who also acts, an older brother, Erik, and a younger brother, Peter. Her father is a former member of the United States Air Force.
She also spent her early years in Bedminster, NJ with her family.

Career
Yarosh first appeared on film at the age of 5 as an extra in The Stepford Wives (2004), starring Nicole Kidman, which filmed in her home town. She began studying acting and dance, first appearing off-Broadway, and then won the role of ballet dancer Karen in the 2009 Broadway production of Billy Elliot at the Imperial Theatre, when she was 10.

Yarosh moved with her mother to Los Angeles at age 12, and began booking bit parts on television, including the series 30 Rock and Law & Order: Special Victims Unit. She appeared in the 2012 film, The Color of Time, starring Mila Kunis and James Franco, playing the first love of poet C. K. Williams. Yarosh then had recurring roles on the Nick at Nite sitcom  See Dad Run, and the Showtime series Shameless, replacing Dove Cameron in the latter series. She postponed attending college full time when she was cast in the NBC sci-fi miniseries Heroes Reborn.

Yarosh played Samantha, the would-be daughter of Jack Reacher (Tom Cruise) in the 2016 action film Jack Reacher: Never Go Back. She starred opposite Erin Moriarty and Helen Hunt in the 2018 sports drama The Miracle Season. She played Caroline "Line" Found, a star Iowa City West High School volleyball player, whose team went on to win the state championship after she was killed in a moped accident. Yarosh was cast opposite Teri Polo and Dylan Walsh in Foreign Exchange, a drama written by Chris Sivertson.  She also appeared in Back Roads, a film directed by Alex Pettyfer. Yarosh joined the cast of the Netflix series Greenhouse Academy for its third season, replacing actress Grace Van Dien in the role of Brooke Osmond. In 2019, she signed on to the second season of the USA Network series The Purge, recurring as college student Kelen Stewart.

Personal Life
She shared on instagram that she is currenlty in a relationship with fellow actress Temara Melek

Filmography

Notes
A.  Known as Perfect Family, Perfect Murder when shown by Channel 5 in the UK

References

External links 
 

1998 births
Living people
21st-century American actresses
Actresses from New Jersey
American child actresses
American film actresses
American television actresses
People from Bedminster, New Jersey
People from Morristown, New Jersey